Charlotte Bruce may refer to:

Charlotte Bruce (Prime Minister's wife) (1832–1906), wife of Henry Campbell-Bannerman
Charlotte Bruce, wife of Terry L. Bruce
Charlotte Bruce, wife of Frederick Locker-Lampson
Charlotte Bruce (1771–1816), wife of Philip Charles Durham